Eva Smith may refer to:
 Eva Marree Kullander Smith, sex workers' rights activist murdered in 2013
 Eva Munson Smith, American composer, poet, and author